Diego Adrián Romero Oivadis (born 3 January 1975) is an Argentine former professional footballer who played as a defensive midfielder.

Club career
After coming through the youth ranks at hometown side Quilmes, Romero joined Atlético de Rafaela in 1998. After leaving the club in 2002, he represented Slovenia's Mura, Mexico's Alacranes de Durango and Ecuador's Olmedo and Técnico Universitario before arriving in Spain in 2007 to play for Villanueva.

Romero went on to resume his career in the Spanish lower levels, playing for Unión Estepona, Los Barrios, San Pedro, Formentera, Sant Jordi, Montuïri, Santanyí and UD Son Verí, achieving promotions to Tercera División with both Formentera and Santanyí.

Personal life
Romero's sons Luka and Tobías are also footballers. The former is an attacking midfielder and plays at S.S. Lazio, while the latter is a goalkeeper.

References

External links
Punto Balón Balear profile 

1975 births
Living people
People from Quilmes
Argentine footballers
Association football midfielders
Primera Nacional players
Quilmes Atlético Club footballers
Atlético de Rafaela footballers
Defensores de Belgrano footballers
NK Mura players
Alacranes de Durango footballers
Ecuadorian Serie A players
C.D. Olmedo footballers
C.D. Técnico Universitario footballers
Tercera División players
Divisiones Regionales de Fútbol players
UD San Pedro players
SD Formentera players
Argentine expatriate footballers
Argentine expatriate sportspeople in Slovenia
Argentine expatriate sportspeople in Mexico
Argentine expatriate sportspeople in Ecuador
Argentine expatriate sportspeople in Spain
Expatriate footballers in Slovenia
Expatriate footballers in Mexico
Expatriate footballers in Ecuador
Expatriate footballers in Spain
Sportspeople from Buenos Aires Province